Mirko Kovač (born 1 March 1983) is a Serbian professional basketball player who last played for Kumanovo of the Macedonian First League. He was a member of the Serbian cadet and junior national team. He won cadet European Championship '99.
He was 3rd MVP Serbian League  and best 3 points shoter 2006.
Best 3 points shooter in Romanian League 2014.

External links
 Mirko Kovač at abaliga.com
 Mirko Kovač at eurobasket.com

References

1983 births
Living people
ABA League players
APOEL B.C. players
KK Crvena zvezda players
KK Partizan players
OKK Beograd players
Serbian men's basketball players
Serbian expatriate basketball people in Cyprus
Serbian expatriate basketball people in Greece
Serbian expatriate basketball people in Poland
Serbian expatriate basketball people in Romania
Serbian expatriate basketball people in North Macedonia
Small forwards